CIMG-FM is a Canadian radio station being licensed to Swift Current, Saskatchewan serving the southwest Saskatchewan area broadcasting at 94.1 FM with a classic hits format branded as The Eagle 94.1. The station is currently owned and operated by Golden West Broadcasting, which also owns sister stations CKFI-FM and CKSW. The station had been broadcasting since October 20, 1979.

In November 2016, CIMG's studios relocated to the top floor of Innovation Credit Union at 198 1st avenue north east in Swift Current.

External links
The Eagle 94.1
 

Img
Img
Img
Img
Radio stations established in 1979
1979 establishments in Saskatchewan